Lao Statistics Bureau is the state agency charged with the collection and publication of statistics related to the economy, population and society of Laos.

References

External links
 LSB

Government of Laos
Laos